A disintegrin and metalloproteinase with thrombospondin motifs 10 is an enzyme that in humans is encoded by the ADAMTS10 gene.

This gene belongs to the ADAMTS (a disintegrin and metalloproteinase domain with thrombospondin type-1 motifs) family of zinc-dependent proteases. ADAMTS proteases are complex secreted enzymes containing a prometalloprotease domain of the reprolysin type attached to an ancillary domain with a highly conserved structure that includes at least one thrombospondin type 1 repeat. They have been demonstrated to have important roles in connective tissue organization, coagulation, inflammation, arthritis, angiogenesis and cell migration. The product of this gene plays a major role in growth and in skin, lens, and heart development. It is also a candidate gene for autosomal recessive Weill-Marchesani syndrome.

References

Further reading

External links
  GeneReviews/NIH/NCBI/UW entry on Weill-Marchesani Syndrome
 The MEROPS online database for peptidases and their inhibitors: M12.235
 

ADAMTS